is a passenger railway station located in the city of Katsuura, Chiba Prefecture, Japan operated by the East Japan Railway Company (JR East).

Lines

Station Layout 
Ubara Station has a single island platform connected to a wooden station building by a footbridge. The station is unattended.

Platform

History
Ubara Station was opened on 15 April 1927. It was absorbed into the JR East network upon the privatization of the Japan National Railways (JNR) on 1 April 1987.  The station became a kan'i itaku station in 1990. From 2017, the station became unmanned.

Passenger statistics
In fiscal 2015, the station was used by an average of 84 passengers daily (boarding passengers only).

Surrounding area
 
 Ubara Port

See also
 List of railway stations in Japan

References

External links

  JR East Station information 

Railway stations in Japan opened in 1927
Railway stations in Chiba Prefecture
Sotobō Line
Katsuura, Chiba